Schismatomma is a genus of lichenized fungi in the family Roccellaceae.

References

Roccellaceae
Lichen genera
Taxa named by Julius von Flotow
Taxa named by Gustav Wilhelm Körber